Mariska Karasz (1898 in Budapest, Hungary – August 27, 1960 in Danbury, Connecticut) was an American fashion designer, author, and textile artist. She had a passion for fashion design and created colorful, patterned garments largely inspired by the folk art of her native country. Her abstract wall hangings mixing fibers such as silk, cotton, wool, and hemp with horsehair and wood garnered her extensive national, and even international, attention. Critics repeatedly praised her for her skillful and unusual use of color, her creative combinations of materials, and her inspiring efforts to promote a modern approach to embroidery.

Biography

Karasz learned to sew as a young girl in Hungary. She immigrated to New York City in 1914 at the age of sixteen. Karasz was the younger sister of industrial designer and New Yorker cover artist Ilonka Karasz. She taught herself embroidery, utilizing her family, animals, and the natural world surrounding her studio in Brewster, New York, as subject matter. As her talent developed, her pieces became increasingly abstract and refined.

Mariska soon established a successful career as a fashion designer. Her foreign background and new American identity defined her custom clothing for women in the 1920s, which combined Hungarian folk elements with a modern American style.

In the early 1930s, after her marriage to Donald Peterson and the births of her two daughters, Solveig and Rosamond, Karasz began designing modern children's clothing, which was admired by parents, scholars, and critics for its practicality and originality. Her career in fashion ended in the early 1940s, following a studio fire and the entry of the United States into World War II.

Mariska Karasz died in 1960, aged 62 years.

Artistic career

In 1947, during the rise of American studio craft and abstract expressionism, Karasz began creating embroidered wall hangings. She exhibited her work in museums and galleries across the county, in over 50 solo shows during the 1950s.

She also authored the book Adventures in Stitches in 1949 (republished in an expanded version in 1959), an influential book on creative needlework, and served as guest needlework editor for House Beautiful from 1952-1953.

The first retrospective of her work took place at the Georgia Museum of Art from January 20 to April 15, 2007. In 2010 her work was included in the exhibition "Textiles Recycled/Reimagined" at the Baltimore Museum of Art.

Publications

References

Callahan, Ashley: Modern Threads: Fashion and Art by Mariska Karasz. Athens, GA: Georgia Museum of Art, 2007.
Biography at the Smithsonian American Art Museum, retrieved 28 June 2007

External links

 "Modern Threads: Fashion and Art by Mariska Karasz" shortlisted by the Costume Society of America

1898 births
1960 deaths
American textile designers
American fashion designers
Hungarian fashion designers
Hungarian women fashion designers
20th-century American women artists
People from Danbury, Connecticut
20th-century women textile artists
20th-century textile artists
American women fashion designers
Hungarian emigrants to the United States
American embroiderers